Taein Heo clan was one of the Korean clans. Their Bon-gwan was in Jeongeup, North Jeolla Province. According to the research in 2015, the number of Taein Heo clan was 11990.

See also 
 Korean clan names of foreign origin

References

External links